Captain Blood is a 1960 French–Italian swashbuckler film directed by André Hunebelle and starring Jean Marais, Bourvil, Elsa Martinelli and Lise Delamare. It is based on a novel by Michel Zévaco.

The film has no relation to the American film Captain Blood (1935).

Plot summary

The young King Louis XIII is dominated by his mother Marie de Medici and her favorite Concino Concini. Francois de Capestang, a faithful knight falls for the daughter of the Duke of Angouleme that conspires against the Crown by his side.

Cast
 Jean Marais as François de Capestan 
 Bourvil as Cogolin 
 Elsa Martinelli as Gisèle d'Angoulême 
 Arnoldo Foà as Concino Concini
  as Giuseppa 
 Lise Delamare as Marie de Médicis 
  as Béatrice de Beaufort 
 Guy Delorme as Rinaldo
  as Louis XIII
 Jacqueline Porel as Léonora Galigaï
 Jean-Paul Coquelin as Vitry
 Raphaël Patorni as Le duc d'Angoulême
  as Duc de Rohan
 Jean Berger as Luynes
  as Lorenzo
 Paul Préboist as A thief

Release
Captain Blood was released theatrically in France on  5 October 1960. It was released in Italy on 24 November 1960.

See also
 The Captain (1946)

References

Bibliography

External links
 
 
 

1960 films
Italian adventure films
French adventure films
1960 adventure films
French swashbuckler films
Italian swashbuckler films
1960s French-language films
Films directed by André Hunebelle
Films set in the 1610s
Films based on French novels
Remakes of French films
Cultural depictions of Louis XIII
Cultural depictions of Marie de' Medici
1960s French films
1960s Italian films